Ástor Piazzolla International Airport, also known as Mar del Plata Airport, is an airport serving Mar del Plata, an Atlantic coastal city in the Buenos Aires Province of Argentina.

The airport was named after Brigadier General , one of the founders of the Argentine Air Force. In August 2008 it was renamed in honour of composer and musician Ástor Piazzolla, who was born in Mar del Plata.

The present terminal building was constructed in 1978 for the FIFA World Cup. In 1994 the terminal was expanded for the Pan American Games. Aeropuertos Argentina 2000 took over airport operation in October 1998.

Airlines and destinations

Statistics

See also
Transport in Argentina
List of airports in Argentina

References

External links

Airports in Buenos Aires Province